Shanagolden is a town in Ashland County in the U.S. state of Wisconsin. The population was 125 at the 2010 census. The unincorporated community of Shanagolden is located in the town.

Geography

Demographics
As of the census of 2000, there were 150 people, 63 households, and 48 families residing in the town. The population density was 1.7 people per square mile (0.6/km2). There were 157 housing units at an average density of 1.8 per square mile (0.7/km2). The racial makeup of the town was 98.67% White and 1.33% Native American.

There were 63 households, out of which 33.3% had children under the age of 18 living with them, 63.5% were married couples living together, 6.3% had a female householder with no husband present, and 23.8% were non-families. 22.2% of all households were made up of individuals, and 12.7% had someone living alone who was 65 years of age or older. The average household size was 2.38 and the average family size was 2.77.

In the town, the population was spread out, with 24.7% under the age of 18, 4.7% from 18 to 24, 28.7% from 25 to 44, 22.7% from 45 to 64, and 19.3% who were 65 years of age or older. The median age was 41 years. For every 100 females, there were 120.6 males. For every 100 females age 18 and over, there were 113.2 males.

The median income for a household in the town was $26,250, and the median income for a family was $31,250. Males had a median income of $26,875 versus $19,000 for females. The per capita income for the town was $17,450. There were 3.7% of families and 4.0% of the population living below the poverty line, including no under eighteens and 17.1% of those over 64.

References

Towns in Ashland County, Wisconsin
Towns in Wisconsin